Josh Joplin Group was an Atlanta, Georgia-based rock band led by singer-songwriter Josh Joplin. Initially a trio, Joplin hired Geoff Melkonian (bass/viola/vocals) and Jason Buecker (drums/percussion/vocals) to accompany him to play shows together. They simply called themselves Josh Joplin Band. In late 1995 they began pre-production on their first album together. Recorded at Furies Studios with producer Ed Burdell (Magnapop), Projector Head was released, January 6, 1996. Based on local critical success and some airplay on local radio Joplin, Buecker, and Melkonian, began touring vigorously, starting in the south, continuing through the northeast, and beyond.

Boxing Nostalgic was their self produced sophomore effort. It was released April 6, 1997 to a sold-out show at the Cotton Club The album introduced piano to their sound and Allen Broyles who played on the record would join the band that same year. The band continued touring and opening shows for Jump, Little Children, Five-eight, The Innocence Mission, Ben Harper, Nathan Sheppard, Kitty Snyder, among others.

In 1998, having played the Roxy Theatre (Atlanta) opening for Shawn Mullins, the Grammy-nominated songwriter of Lullaby, the band discussed making their third album with their friend and Mullins signed on as the producer hiring Anthony J. Resta to create the beats and programming for it. He would later release the album entitled, Useful Music, on his own SMG label. Shortly after its release, Jason Buecker was replaced on drums by Ani Cordero, then Eric Taylor who drummed for legendary dream pop founders, Seely (on Too Pure Records). Deeds Davis was added to play lead guitar and sing.

The band was managed briefly by Nettwerk Music Group before making a slight name change to Josh Joplin Group when Artemis Records headed by legendary industry moguls Danny Goldberg and Daniel Glass. signed them to their label.  They were picked up by Indigo Girls and Matthew Sweet manager, Russell Carter.

The Artemis re-release would feature an alternative version of Joplin's ballad, I've Changed. It was lavishly produced by Peter Collins at Ocean Way Nashville recording studio, with Kenny Aronoff playing drums. A slightly more successful collaboration came when ex-Modern Lover / Talking Head, Jerry Harrison was brought on produce the opening track, Matter and Joplin's new song, Camera One, which hadn't been previously released.

The album came out on January 30, 2001 to strong reviews and sold over 100,000 records in its first week. Its single, "Camera One," was the first independent release to go number-one at Triple A radio and went to number 22 on the Billboard Top 40 chart in 2001. It won the "Single Of The Year" award by the American Association of Independent Music. Useful Music songs were featured in many of the top rated shows of the time, including Party of Five, Dawson's Creek, Northern Exposure, and Camera One was a feature of an episode of the comedy series Scrubs.

Josh Joplin Group toured America, Mexico, Canada, Australia, and all of Europe. They played shows with countless bands, and artists including Travis, Old 97's, Matthew Sweet, Uncle Green, Yeah Yeah Yeahs, Lifehouse, Pink, Smoke, and had finished performing a German festival in Cologne, when Green Day burned their drums on stage. The band has also appeared on Late Night with Conan O'Brien, Late Show with David Letterman, The Late Late Show with Craig Ferguson, The Panel (Australian TV series), The Mike Bullard Show, Viva TV (Germany), MTV, VH1.

In June 2002, Josh Joplin began working on demos for songwriter turned producer, Fountains of Wayne's Adam Schlesinger. Schlesinger was tapped to produce the group's sophomore Artemis release. He recorded 12 songs acoustically at Stratosphere Sound, (owned by Schlesinger and James Iha). And although the timing didn't work out for the two to work together, Josh and the group, sans Davis, did end up recording   The Future That Was. with Atlanta producer, Rob Gal and engineers, John Holbrook and Rudyard Lee Cullers at Stratosphere.  On this record, the musical styles were similarly varied, ranging from slow piano- and acoustic guitar-driven pop to upbeat keyboard- and electric guitar-based rock.

The Future That Was received critical acclaim but it sold poorly and Artemis released dropped the band from their contract.  Artemis released two singles from the album, "I Am Not the Only Cowboy" and "Wonder Wheel," but neither one took off. In the fall of 2003, the band announced that it was breaking up and would play its final two shows in Atlanta in December of that year.

Discography

Josh Joplin Band

Projector Head
 Release Date: January 6, 1996
 Label: Self-released
Boxing Nostalgic
 Release Date: April 6, 1997
 Label: Self-released
Useful Music
 Release Date: May 25, 1999
 Label: SMG Records

Josh Joplin Group
Useful Music
 Release Date: January 23, 2001
 Label: Artemis Records, Sony Music (Europe), Epic Records (Australia, South Africa)
The Future That Was
 Release Date: September 24, 2002
 Label: Artemis Records

References

American pop music groups